Brian D. Wirth is an American engineer, currently the Governor's Chair Professor at the University of Tennessee and an Elected Fellow of the American Association for the Advancement of Science.

References

Year of birth missing (living people)
Living people
Fellows of the American Association for the Advancement of Science
University of Tennessee faculty
21st-century American engineers
University of California, Santa Barbara alumni